Paul Rose, usually known as Scuba (also known by his SCB alias), is a British electronic musician, now based in Berlin. Described as 'one of dance music's most inventive producers', he has released five albums, numerous singles and EPs, and a handful of compilation and mix albums. His style has been described as dubstep with a later 'shift toward a brighter and more eclectic approach to production'. In 2013, he won an award for Best Live Act from DJ Mag.

History
Paul Rose began his musical career in late 90s Indie band, Violet, where he played keyboards alongside bass player, Razorlight founder, Johnny Borrell and received his first official song writing credit on the song "Sleepwalking" on the band's only release before acrimonious breakup live on stage where Paul and frontman, David Bartlett, would go on to destroy the venue's PA. He later founded the Hotflush Recordings label in 2003, where he released material by Mount Kimbie, Benga and Joy Orbison alongside his own music.

In 2007, Scuba relocated from London to Berlin. He cited reasons including dissatisfaction with his place in the London scene: 'I had just started to make a living from making music and the position I was in musically was one that I wasn't particularly enjoying'. He had performed a number of shows in Berlin before and maintained that he 'wanted to get away from London and nowhere in the UK would have fitted'. Berlin became his choice of residence partly as his friend Jamie Teasdale, of the early Dubstep duo Vex’d, had moved there.

Established in Berlin by 2008, Rose released his debut album, A Mutual Antipathy, described as featuring 'subs, huge drum patterns, dry synths worthy of minimal's finest sound designers and emotional crescendos enough to perhaps even satisfy a trance lover'.

His sophomore album, Triangulation, released in 2010, was seen as a 'breakthrough', and was described as 'expertly juxtaposing the dark with the romantic, the hectic with the serene'.

2011 saw a move away from Dubstep with the release of the singles, Loss, under his SCB alias, and Adrenalin, which contained 'three positively beaming slices of trancey (trancey!) techno' Both were listed in Resident Advisor's top 20 tracks of the year.

The third Scuba album, Personality, was released in 2012. Continuing the stylistic shift of the previous year, it was described as 'using prog house, trance, big beat, rave, old techno, and synth pop to create something stylishly retro. In 2019, Mixmag listed the album as one of the best of the decade.

After suffering health problems and an enforced break from touring, the release of fourth album, Claustrophobia, was released in April 2015. The album was described as 'a major step up; the sonics are simply dazzling. Rattled keys, wind chimes, rubbed wineglass rims, half-heard voices, and all manner of incidental rustle serve to make the music leap from the speakers.' Others saw it as a 'a lateral move rather than a step forward.'

Following the release of A Mutual Antipathy, Rose forged close links with the Berghain nightclub, where in July 2008 he launched a series of parties named SUB:STANCE, together with promoter Paul Fowler. He released an accompanying compilation album in 2010. This was followed in 2018 by a retrospective compilation, Sounds Of SUB:STANCE, and an album of unreleased material produced during the event's five-year run to 2013, entitled SUB:STANCE In Retrograde.

In addition to the SUB:STANCE mix released on Ostgut Ton, Scuba has also curated mix albums for the DJ-Kicks (2012) and Fabric (club) (2016) series.

After an extended break in which he focused on his SCB side-project, Rose returned to releasing music as Scuba in 2019.

Discography

Albums
A Mutual Antipathy (Hotflush, 2008)
Triangulation (Hotflush, 2010)
Personality (Hotflush, 2012)
Claustrophobia (Hotflush, 2015)
SUB:STANCE in Retrograde (Hotflush, 2018)
Diivorce (Hotflush, 2021)

Selected Singles & EPs
Timba / Sleepa (Hotflush, 2005)
Aesaunic EP (Hotflush, 2009)
Adrenalin (Hotflush, 2011)
Talk Torque (Hotflush, 2012)
Hardbody (Hotflush, 2012)
Phenix1 EP (Hotflush, 2014)
Phenix2 EP (Hotflush, 2014)
Phenix3 EP (Hotflush, 2014)
Expectations (Hotflush, 2019)
Never Forget (Hotflush, 2020)
This Is For You (Hotflush, 2020)
Forgive Me (Hotflush, 2020)
Tango (Hotflush, 2021)
Womb (Hotflush, 2021)

Compilation albums
Update (Hotflush, 2013)

DJ mix albums
Sub:Stance (Ostgut Ton, 2010)
DJ-KiCKS (!K7 Records, 2011)
fabric 90 (Fabric, 2016)

References

External links
 
 WME booking page for Scuba of WME talent agency

Living people
Dubstep musicians
Year of birth missing (living people)
Hotflush Recordings artists